Tanya Schmoller (3 March 1918 – 14 January 2016) was a Uruguayan-born British historian of graphic art, and the personal assistant to Allen Lane, the co-founder of Penguin Books.

She was born in Conchillas, Uruguay on 3 March 1918.

In 1950, she married Hans Schmoller, Penguin's Typographer, and had one step-daughter and one son.

Schmoller died in Sheffield, England, on 14 January 2016.

Notable publications

 Hans Schmoller ; Tanya Schmoller ; Henry Morris: Chinese decorated papers. "Chinoiserie for three". Bird & Bull Press, Newtown, Pa. 1987.
 Remondini and Rizzi. A chapter in Italian decorated paper history. Oak Knoll Books, New Castle, Del. 1990.  
 Sheffield papermakers. 3 centuries of papermaking in the Sheffield area. Allenholme Press, Wylam 1992.

References

British women historians
1918 births
2016 deaths
Penguin Books people
Uruguayan emigrants
Uruguayan emigrants to the United Kingdom